The Aiguille de Tré-la-Tête is a mountain in the south of the Mont Blanc massif. Only the northwest pinnacle is situated on the border with France. It forms a chain with the Dômes de Miage.

It comprises four summits: 
 l'aiguille Nord or Tête Blanche (3,892 m) ; north top
 l'aiguille centrale Nord-Ouest (3,846 m) ; central northwest top
 l'aiguille centrale Sud-Est (highest point, 3,930 m) ; central southeast top
 l'aiguille orientale (3,895 m); east top.

The western slope of the mountain is part of the Contamines-Montjoie Nature Reserve

History 
In September 2007, the body of a young mountaineer, who had died in 1954, was discovered on the glacier. It was found by a hiker at an elevation of 2,500 metres below a mountain trail. After investigation, it was ascertained to be a 24-year-old man who had disappeared on 4 August 1954 with his 21-year-old brother and 16-year-old sister, returning from climbing the ascent Aiguille de la Lex Blanche (3,697 m) The bodies of two younger people were found two kilometres above the foot of the glacier face.

Bibliography

References

See also

List of mountains of the Alps above 3000 m

External links 

Aiguille de Tré la Tète at camptocamp.

Mountains of the Alps
Mountains of Aosta Valley
Mountains partially in France
Alpine three-thousanders
Mont Blanc massif